Boni Eli Petcoff (February 1, 1900 – August 5, 1965) was an American football tackle and coach. He was born in Bulgaria and came to the United States at age six. He played college football at Ohio State University and professionally in the National Football League (NFL) with the Columbus Tigers from 1924 to 1926. He was selected as a first-team tackle on the 1924 All-Pro Team. Petcoff served as the head football coach at the University of Toledo from 1926 to 1929, compiling a record of 13–15–1. After retiring from football, he was a physician. He died in 1965 at age 65.

Head coaching record

References

External links
 
 

1900 births
1965 deaths
20th-century American physicians
American football tackles
Columbus Tigers players
Ohio State Buckeyes football players
Toledo Rockets football coaches
Sportspeople from Toledo, Ohio
Coaches of American football from Ohio
Players of American football from Ohio
Bulgarian emigrants to the United States